Graeme Shearer (29 September 1948 – 10 July 1983) was an Australian rules footballer who played with Fitzroy in the Victorian Football League (VFL).

Notes

External links 
		

1948 births
1983 deaths
Australian rules footballers from Victoria (Australia)
Fitzroy Football Club players